Patrīcija Ksenija Cuprijanoviča (born 25 June 2001), better known as Patrisha or Patriša, is a Latvian singer, songwriter and radio personality.

Life 
Patricija was born in Riga. She lived with her family in Vecmīlgrāvis until she was 13 years old, then the family moved to Kalngali. She returned to Riga at the age of 18.

She has been singing since childhood. The singer's talent was especially noticed at school, singing in the choir. She attended the creative children's and youth studio "Star Island" and since the age of 11 has participated in more than 60 singing competitions, both in Latvia ("April drops" and "Voice Commander") and abroad (Poland, Ukraine, Malta and elsewhere). She got her first big recognition in the Ukrainian competition "Молода Галичина", where she won the second place at the age of 15. She also participated in the Latvian selection of the Russian television show "Golos" ("Voice").

At the age of 16, Patricija gained her first wider recognition in Latvia by participating in the Latvian version of the show X Faktors in 2017, despite the fact that she did not succeed in the show. At the beginning of 2019, she became the first musician from Latvia to sign a contract with one of the world's largest music labels, Universal Music Group, under whose auspices he released three singles “Es varu būt tā”, “Visu un vēl vairāk” and “Lai tev sāp”. Already at that time, she was considered one of the most successful young musicians in Latvia. At the end of the year, on November 27, the debut EP with six songs "Patrisha bija šeit" was released. In 2020, she won the Golden Microphone Award in the "Best Debut" category, while the album was nominated in the "Pop Music Album" category.

From May 21, 2020, she hosts the Radio EHR program "Latvian Music Stage".

In January 2023 it was announced Patrisha would perform at Supernova with the song "Hush", trying to represent Latvia at the Eurovision Song Contest in Liverpool. On February 4 she made it through the semifinal to enter the top ten. Patrisha finish in second place behind Sudden Lights with 20 points.

Discography

Albums

Singles

External links

References 

Latvian singers
2001 births
People from Riga
Living people